Sebastiania daphniphylla is a species of flowering plant in the family Euphorbiaceae. It was originally described as Stillingia daphniphylla Baill. in 1865. It is native to Rio de Janeiro, Brazil.

References

Plants described in 1865
Flora of Brazil
daphniphylla
Taxa named by Johannes Müller Argoviensis
Taxa named by Henri Ernest Baillon